"There's a Guy Works Down the Chip Shop Swears He's Elvis" is a song by British singer-songwriter Kirsty MacColl, which was released as the lead single from her debut studio album Desperate Character. The song was written by MacColl and Philip Rambow, and produced by Barry Farmer. It reached No. 14 in the UK Singles Chart and remained in the charts for nine weeks. In the US, the song's British chip shop reference was changed to truck stop.

Norwegian singer Elisabeth Andreasson covered the song on her 1981 country album Angel of the Morning, with lyrics in Swedish by Hasse Olsson as "Killen ner' på Konsum svär att han är Elvis" ("The guy down Konsum" swears he's Elvis).

Critical reception
On its release, Simon Ludgate of Record Mirror considered the song a "catchy little number" and "ultimately a tale of betrayal". He added, "Imagine Dave Edmunds singing a song by Chris Sievey and you'll get the idea". Fred Dellar of Smash Hits considered the song "just an average sample of rocked-up country music" but commented on the "wonderful" title.

Track listing
7" single
 "There's a Guy Works Down the Chip Shop Swears He's Elvis" - 3:07
 "Hard to Believe" - 2:19
 "There's a Guy Works Down the Chip Shop Swears He's Elvis" (Country version) - 3:44

7" single (US release)
 "There's a Guy Works Down the Chip Shop Swears He's Elvis" - 3:45
 "Over You" - 2:35

Personnel
Production
 Barry Farmer - producer, mixing
 Kirsty MacColl - mixing

Other
 Rob O'Conner - sleeve design
 Chalkie Davies - front cover photography
 Frank Murray - front cover model
 Alan Ballard - back cover photography

Charts

References

External links
 freeworld - Kirsty MacColl fansite

1981 singles
1981 songs
Kirsty MacColl songs
Elisabeth Andreassen songs
Songs written by Kirsty MacColl
Songs about Elvis Presley
Polydor Records singles